Ján Šafranko (born 15 August 1975 in Svidník) is a former Slovak football player who recently played for 1. FC Tatran Prešov .

External links
 at official club website 

1975 births
Living people
Slovak footballers
Penang F.C. players
Olympiakos Nicosia players
Expatriate footballers in Cyprus
Association football midfielders
Cypriot Second Division players
People from Svidník
Sportspeople from the Prešov Region